Fantastic Playroom is the debut studio album by English band New Young Pony Club. It was released on 6 July 2007 by Island Records. The album debuted at number 54 on the UK Albums Chart, selling 4,804 copies in its first week. As of March 2010, it had sold 32,986 copies in the United Kingdom. Fantastic Playroom was nominated for the Mercury Prize in 2007, and the band performed "The Bomb" on the awards night.

Track listing

Personnel
Credits adapted from the liner notes of Fantastic Playroom.

New Young Pony Club
 Tahita Bulmer – vocals, additional production
 Lou Hayter – keyboards
 Sarah Jones – drums
 Andy Spence – guitar, production
 Igor Volk – bass

Additional personnel
 Dean Chalkey – photography
 Guy Davie – mastering
 Tom Elmhirst – mixing
 Nilesh Patel – mastering
 Richard Robinson – artwork

Charts

Release history

References

2007 debut albums
Island Records albums
Modular Recordings albums
New Young Pony Club albums